Henry Raikes (1782–1854) was an English cleric, chancellor of the diocese of Chester from 1830 to 1854.

Life
He was the son of Thomas Raikes, a London banker and merchant, and Charlotte Finch, daughter of Henry Finch, Earl of Winchelsea. He was educated at Eton College, and matriculated at St John's College, Cambridge in 1800, graduating B.A. in 1804 and M.A. in 1807.

Raikes was ordained deacon in 1807, priest in 1808. He was curate successively at Betchworth, Surrey, then
Burnham, Buckinghamshire and Bognor, to 1828. He was then appointed to Chester Cathedral in 1830.

Family
Raikes married in 1809 1809, Augusta Whittington, daughter of Jacob John Whittington, of Yoxford. He was grandfather of the politician Henry Cecil Raikes (1838–1891).

One of his three brothers was Thomas Raikes, a London banker and merchant known as a diarist and dandy. One of his five sisters, Georgina Raikes, married Lord William FitzRoy.

Archival collections
Archives of Vicar Henry Raikes, Chancellor of the diocese of Chester: correspondence (180 items).
Repository: Manchester University, John Rylands Library Record Reference : Eng Ms 1121. Other reference see HMC Papers of British Churchmen 1780-1940, 1987.
Diary of a tour of Greece in the years 1805 & 1806.
Repository: Liverpool University: Special Collections and Archives. Other reference see Accessions to repositories 1963.
Letters to William Ewart Gladstone and others, 1807-1854.
Repository: British Library, Manuscript Collections. Other reference see Index of MSS, VIII, 1985.

References

External links
G. C. Boase, ‘Raikes, Henry (1782–1854)’, rev. Simon Harrison, Oxford Dictionary of National Biography'', Oxford University Press, 2004

1782 births
1854 deaths
English non-fiction writers
19th-century English Anglican priests
English male non-fiction writers